John Mailer (11 June 1961 – 2006) was a Scottish footballer who played for Dumbarton, Stirling Albion, Hamilton Academical,  Clyde and Cowdenbeath.

References

1961 births
Scottish footballers
Dumbarton F.C. players
Hamilton Academical F.C. players
Stirling Albion F.C. players
Clyde F.C. players
Cowdenbeath F.C. players
Scottish Football League players
2006 deaths
Association football forwards
People from Bridge of Allan